Meir Cohen-Avidov (18 February 1926 – 4 March 2015) was an Israeli politician who served as a member of the Knesset for Likud between 1974 and 1988.

Biography
Born in Haifa during the Mandate era, Cohen-Avidov studied at the School for Jurisprudence and Economics in Tel Aviv, and was certified as a lawyer. He joined the Irgun in 1943 and began working for Haifa City Council in 1945. Between 1946 and 1948 he was imprisoned by the British Authorities.

In 1961 he became the city council's comptroller, a role he held until 1966. Between 1969 and 1973 he was an elected member of the council. A member of Herut's central committee and directorate, in 1973 he was elected to the Knesset on the Likud list, an alliance of Herut, the Liberal Party and several other small right-wing parties. He was re-elected in 1977, a year in which he also became head of the Likud faction in the Histadrut trade union. He was re-elected again in 1981 and 1984, serving as Deputy Speaker following both elections, before losing his seat in the 1988 elections. He also chaired Likud's Haifa branch. He died in March 2015 at the age of 89.

References

External links
 

1926 births
2015 deaths
20th-century Israeli civil servants
20th-century Israeli lawyers
21st-century Israeli lawyers
City councillors of Haifa
Deputy Speakers of the Knesset
Herut politicians
Irgun members
Israeli Jews
Israeli trade unionists
Jewish Israeli politicians
Jews in Mandatory Palestine
Likud politicians
Members of the 8th Knesset (1974–1977)
Members of the 9th Knesset (1977–1981)
Members of the 10th Knesset (1981–1984)
Members of the 11th Knesset (1984–1988)
Politicians from Haifa